The Trans-Allegheny Lunatic Asylum, subsequently the Weston State Hospital, was a Kirkbride psychiatric hospital that was operated from 1864 until 1994 by the government of the U.S. state of West Virginia, in the city of Weston. Weston State Hospital got its name in 1913 which was used while patients occupied it, but was changed back to its originally commissioned, unused name, the Trans-Allegheny Lunatic Asylum, after being reopened as a tourist attraction.

Designed by Gothic Revival and Tudor Revival styles by Baltimore architect Richard Snowden Andrews, it was constructed from 1858 to 1881. Originally designed to hold 250 people, it became overcrowded in the 1950s with 2,400 patients. It was forcibly closed in 1994 due to changes in patient treatment. The hospital was bought by Joe Jordan in 2007, and is opened for tours and other events to raise money for its restoration. The hospital's main building is claimed to be one of the largest hand-cut stone masonry buildings in the United States, and the second largest hand-cut sandstone building in the world, with the only bigger one being in the Moscow Kremlin. As Weston Hospital Main Building, it was designated a National Historic Landmark in 1990.

History

19th century
The hospital was authorized by the Virginia General Assembly in the early 1850s as the Trans-Allegheny Lunatic Asylum.  Following consultations with Thomas Story Kirkbride, then-superintendent of the Pennsylvania Hospital for the Insane, a building in the Kirkbride Plan was designed in the Gothic Revival and Tudor Revival styles by Richard Snowden Andrews (1830–1903), an architect from Baltimore whose other commissions included the Maryland Governor's residence in Annapolis and the south wing of the U.S. Treasury building in Washington.  Construction on the site, along the West Fork River opposite downtown Weston, began in late 1858.  Work was initially conducted by prison laborers; a local newspaper in November of that year noted "seven convict negroes" as the first arrivals for work on the project.  Skilled stonemasons were later brought in from Germany and Ireland.

Construction was interrupted by the outbreak of the American Civil War in 1861.  Following its secession from the United States, the government of Virginia demanded the return of the hospital's unused construction funds for its defense. Before this could occur, the 7th Ohio Volunteer Infantry seized the money from a local bank, delivering it to Wheeling. It was put towards the establishment of the Reorganized Government of Virginia, which sided with the northern states during the war.  The Reorganized Government appropriated money to resume construction in 1862. Following the admission of West Virginia as a U.S. state in 1863, the hospital was renamed the West Virginia Hospital for the Insane.  The first patients were admitted in October 1864, but construction continued into 1881.  The 200-foot (61 m) central clock tower was completed in 1871, and separate rooms for black people were completed in 1873.  The hospital was intended to be self-sufficient, and a farm, dairy, waterworks, and cemetery were located on its grounds, which ultimately reached  in area.

Back then, patients were admitted into the asylum for a variety of reasons including asthma, laziness, egotism, domestic troubles, and even greediness. This led to an overwhelming number of patients being admitted, causing the asylum to face a shortage of staff and beds.

20th century
A gas well was drilled on the hospital grounds in 1902.  Its name was again changed to Weston State Hospital in 1913.

Originally designed to house 250 patients in solitude, the hospital held 717 patients by 1880; 1,661 in 1938; over 1,800 in 1949; at its peak, 2,600 in the 1950s in overcrowded conditions.  A 1938 report by a survey committee organized by a group of North American medical organizations found that the hospital housed "epileptics, alcoholics, drug addicts and non-educable mental defectives" among its population.  A series of reports by The Charleston Gazette in 1949 found poor sanitation and insufficient furniture, lighting, and heating in  much of the complex, while one wing, which had been rebuilt using Works Progress Administration funds following a 1935 fire started by a patient, was comparatively luxurious.

The lack of proper care and access to sanitation led to a large number of deaths at the asylum. While the official count of patients who have died in the asylum is not available, historians have estimated the number to be between 400 and 500.

Weston State Hospital found itself to be the home for the West Virginia Lobotomy Project in the early 1950s. This was an effort by the state of West Virginia and Walter Freeman to use lobotomy to reduce the number of patients in asylums because there was severe overcrowding.

By the 1980s, the hospital had a reduced population due to changes in the treatment of mental illness. Those patients who could not be controlled were often locked in cages.  In February 1986, then-Governor Arch Moore announced plans to build a new psychiatric facility elsewhere in the state and convert the Weston hospital to a prison. Ultimately the new facility, the William R. Sharpe Jr. Hospital, was built in Weston and the old Weston State Hospital was simply closed in May 1994.  The building and its grounds have since been mostly vacant, aside from local events such as fairs, church revivals, and tours.  In 1999, all four floors of the interior of the building were damaged by several city and county police officers playing paintball, three of whom were dismissed over the incident.

Efforts towards adaptive reuse of the building have included proposals to convert the building into a Civil War Museum and a hotel and golf course complex.  A non-profit 501(c)3 organization, the Weston Hospital Revitalization Committee, was formed in 2000 for the purpose of aiding the preservation of the building and finding appropriate tenants.

21st century
Three small museums devoted to military history, toys, and mental health were opened on the first floor of the main hospital building in 2004, but were soon forced to close due to fire code violations.

The hospital was auctioned by the West Virginia Department of Health and Human Resources on August 29, 2007. Joe Jordan, an asbestos demolition contractor from Morgantown, was the high bidder and paid $1.5 million for the  building. Bidding started at $500,000. Joe Jordan has also begun maintenance projects on the former hospital grounds. In October 2007, a Fall Fest was held at the Weston State Hospital. Guided historic and paranormal daytime tours were offered as well as evening ghost hunts and paranormal tours.

The main building of the asylum, known as the Kirkbride, holds several rooms that serve as the museum, located on the first floor. There are paintings, poems, and drawings made by patients in the art therapy programs, a room dedicated to the different medical treatments and restraints used in the past, and artifacts such as a straitjacket and hydrotherapy tub. The tour guides dress in clothes that resemble 19th century nurse outfits; blue dress, white apron, white cap, and white shoes. The shorter historical tour offer allows visitors to see the first floor of the Kirkbride, while the longer historical tour allows visitors to see all four floors, apartments of the staff, the morgue, and the operating room. Aside from the historical tours, there are also two paranormal tours. Both start as the sun sets, the shorter tour lasting around two to three hours, the longer tour being overnight with the option of having a private tour.

In popular culture
The former facility was featured as a haunted location on several paranormal television shows, including Ghost Stories, Syfy's Ghost Hunters, Travel Channel's Ghost Adventures, and Paranormal Lockdown on Destination America/TLC as well as Portals To Hell and most recently Travel Channel's Destination Fear and Conjuring Kesha.
The facility is featured in Bethesda Game Studios' 2018 video game Fallout 76, under the name “Fort Defiance”, acting as a base for The Brotherhood of Steel, one of the game's main factions.
The facility is featured in episode 60 of the podcast Lore.

See also
List of National Historic Landmarks
List of Registered Historic Places in West Virginia

References

External links

 
High Definition video from Kirkbrides HD
Trans-Allegheny Lunatic Asylum at Abandoned
 Trans-Allegheny Lunatic Asylum at Architecture of the State
Trans-Allegheny Lunatic Asylum at Asylum Projects
 Trans-Allegheny Lunatic Asylum at Kirkbride Buildings
 Weston State Hospital Cemetery interments at Find-a-Grave

1864 establishments in West Virginia
1994 disestablishments in West Virginia
Hospital buildings completed in 1881
Buildings and structures in Lewis County, West Virginia
Defunct hospitals in West Virginia
Gothic Revival architecture in West Virginia
Hospital buildings on the National Register of Historic Places in West Virginia
Kirkbride Plan hospitals
National Historic Landmarks in West Virginia
National Register of Historic Places in Lewis County, West Virginia
Psychiatric hospitals in West Virginia
Reportedly haunted locations in West Virginia
Tudor Revival architecture in West Virginia
Works Progress Administration in West Virginia
Hospitals established in 1864
Clock towers in West Virginia
Jacobean architecture in West Virginia